Butyl nitrate is a colorless oil. It is often confused with butyl nitrite, which is sometimes used as a recreational inhalant.

Safety

Butyl nitrate is an explosive. It reacts explosively with Lewis acids such as boron trifluoride and aluminium chloride. When heated to decomposition, it emits toxic fumes of nitrous oxide.

References

"Nitric Acid, Butylester." Butyl Nitrate (928-45-0),Butyl Nitrate (928-45-0) Manufacturers & Suppliers,Synthesis,MSDS. N.p., n.d. Web. 11 Oct. 2012.

Alkyl nitrates
Butyl compounds